The Australian Good University Guide's Australian University of the Year was awarded annually between 1993 and 2001.  Although the Guide assessed each university under a variety of criteria, the award was not necessarily given to the top Australian university, but rather to the university which performed best in the chosen field for that particular year.

The Award was won jointly in 1999-00 when Deakin University and University of Wollongong received top honours. In 2000-01 University of Wollongong again shared the award having tied with University of Southern Queensland.

Deakin University and University of Wollongong where the only multiple recipients having been named University of the Year twice each.

List of winners

References

Universities in Australia